Saint Marys is an unincorporated community in Lafayette Township, Floyd County, Indiana.

Geography 

References 

Unincorporated communities in Floyd County, Indiana
Unincorporated communities in Indiana
Louisville metropolitan area